The 1986 Football League Cup Final (known for sponsorship reasons as the Milk Cup) was a football match held on 20 April 1986 between Oxford United and Queens Park Rangers. Oxford won the match 3–0 to capture the League Cup – their first and only major honour. Trevor Hebberd opened the scoring in the first half, and Ray Houghton added a second. Jeremy Charles scored the third following up when John Aldridge had a shot saved by QPR goalkeeper Paul Barron. The match was played at Wembley Stadium in front of 90,396 spectators.

Because UEFA voted that the ban on English clubs in European competitions (beginning after the Heysel disaster in May 1985) would continue for a second season, Oxford United were denied a place in the 1986–87 UEFA Cup.

Route to the final

Oxford United and Queens Park Rangers were both playing in the First Division and both entered the competition at the second round stage, under the tournament format in place at the time. Oxford had never previously progressed past the quarter finals, which they reached in the 1969–70 and 1983–84 seasons. Queens Park Rangers, on the other hand, were victorious in the 1967 final where they defeated West Bromwich Albion. In the second round, Oxford defeated Northampton Town of the Fourth Division 4–1 on aggregate after two legs. The 2–1 away victory at County Cricket Ground was Oxford's first and only away win at Northampton in cup competitions.
After a third-round home win against Newcastle United, Oxford United faced Second Division side and cup holders Norwich City in the fourth round, winning 3–1. In the fifth round Oxford defeated Portsmouth 3–1, making it the third consecutive round where a 3–1 home victory was recorded. Despite the fifth-round tie, the attendance for the game was around 400 lower than the league average, after a boycott was organised due to increased ticket prices.
The semi-final against First Division Aston Villa was contested over two legs. The first at Villa Park finished 2–2, with the return leg ending in a 2–1 victory for Oxford after goals from Jeremy Charles and Les Phillips.

The London-based club began the competition against Second Division team Hull City, winning 8–1 on aggregate, including a 5–1 away victory at Boothferry Park. In the third round they beat Watford of the First Division 1–0 at Vicarage Road. The "Hoops" defeated another First Division team, Nottingham Forest, in the fourth round, but found the fifth round tougher against Chelsea. After the first match ended in a 1–1 draw at Loftus Road, the reply held at Stamford Bridge ended in a 2–0 win with goals from Alan McDonald and Michael Robinson. In the semi-finals, Queens Park Rangers took on Liverpool. QPR went through 3–2 on aggregate after a 1–0 home win was followed by a 2–2 draw at Anfield. Apart from the second-round tie against Hull City, all the teams that Queens Park Rangers defeated on their way to Wembley played in the First Division, including champions Liverpool. In contrast, Oxford United only faced two, Newcastle United and Aston Villa.

Match details

References

External links
 Full League cup results history
 Final line-ups

EFL Cup Finals
League Cup Final 1986
League Cup Final 1986
1985–86 Football League
April 1986 sports events in the United Kingdom
Football League Cup Final